Bolsover Castle is a former railway station in Bolsover, Derbyshire, England.

Context
The station was built by the Midland Railway on the circuitous  to  line known as The Doe Lea Branch, because it ran for much of its length along the valley of the River Doe Lea. In 1897 the Doe Lea Viaduct was opened, straddling the Doe Lea Branch a short distance to the south of Bolsover Castle station.

History
The station was opened without ceremony on 1 September 1890 as "Bolsover". It initially provided a service of three trains each way between Mansfield and Chesterfield, taking about an hour from end to end.

Normal passenger traffic along the Doe Lea Branch dwindled over the years and finally ceased on 28 July 1930. An unadvertised service continued to call at the station until 14 August 1931 and pre-war excursions continued until at least 27 July 1939. The last steam train to use the line was an enthusiasts' special on 16 October 1965. This train also traversed the Clowne Branch.

British Railways renamed the station "Bolsover Castle" on 25 September 1950 to help distinguish it from the ex-LD&ECR "Bolsover" which became "Bolsover South". Goods facilities were withdrawn from the station on 1 November 1962.

Although regular passenger traffic ceased in 1930 and the line was severed as a through route shortly thereafter by the closure of Rowthorn Tunnel, occasional specials continued to call at the station. A special was run to Chesterfield in connection with the Queen's Jubilee celebrations in Queen's Park on 28 July 1977. This had been on the initiative of the headmaster of Bolsover Church of England Junior School as there were insufficient buses to take all the children to the event. Thereafter, there were yearly August excursions from 1978 until 1981 organised by Bolsover Miners' Welfare when trains of at least nine coaches ran to Scarborough. Another source claims that the last charter from Bolsover Castle was a nine-coach train to  via Chesterfield on 15 November 1980 organised by Bolsover Secondary School PTA.

When Glapwell Colliery closed in 1974 the line South of Bolsover Castle station became redundant, though it was not lifted until 1978. The branch between Bolsover Castle and the bottom of Rylah Hill between Palterton and M1 J29 is now a public bridleway known as The Stockley Trail.

By 20 July 2013 all tracks through Bolsover Castle station site had been lifted, but the trackbed was intact. The station itself was demolished some years ago. A business park had been developed immediately west of the station site. One occupant is a firm providing road-rail vehicles, such as track welding lorries fitted with retractable rail wheels. A length of track with dummy overhead wires, presumably for training and clearance testing purposes, has been installed in their depot in plain view from public areas.

Stationmasters

Job Frederick Fisher 1890 - 1891
W. Hackett 1891 - 1892 
Herbert Mason Read 1892 - 1893 (afterwards station master at Watnall)
Richard Grice 1893 - 1896 (formerly station master at Killamarsh, afterwards station master at Darfield)
William Henry Johnson 1896 - 1899 (afterwards station master at Ullesthorpe)
Herbert H. Willis 1899 - 1902
John Daniel Neale 1902 - 1904 (afterwards station master at Shipley Gate)
John William Palmer 1904 (formerly station master at Glapwell)
Harry York 1904 - 1908 (formerly station master at Attercliffe Road, afterwards station master at Worthington)
George H. Dewey 1908 - 1911 (formerly station master at Worthington, afterwards station master at Burton Joyce)
Samuel Palfreyman 1911 - 1920 (afterwards station master at Swinton)
Ernest C. Beckley ca. 1921 ca. 1924 
G.P. Kirland ca. 1940

Possible future
The line from Foxlow Junction through Seymour Junction to Oxcroft Disposal Point has been lifted but protected from breach or encroachment as there remains the possibility of opencasting in the area. For example, in 2005 UK Coal (now Coalfield Resources), expressed an interest in extracting c530,000 tons near Mastin Moor.

The Doe Lea line South from Seymour Junction to the site of the former Markham Colliery (now known as "The Bolsover Branch") has been mothballed as it runs through the new Markham Vale Enterprise Zone at M1 Junction 29A. The track is in place, but at 20 July 2013 has trees taller than a man growing though the sleepers in places. It is hoped that someone will invest in this infrastructure to create road-rail interchange facilities. The line through Clowne has been lifted, but it, too remains protected from breach or encroachment as it, too, might provide access to Markham Vale from a different direction.

References

Notes

Sources

Further reading

External links
The station on a navigable 1949 OS map NPE maps
The station on overlain OS maps National Library of Scotland
The station and line on overlain OS maps Rail Map Online
Bolsover railway structures Signalboxes
The station, line and mileages Railway Codes
The line and station Richards Bygone Times
The station, staff and tickets Old Miner
One of the station's former signs English Heritage
The station in its early years eBay
The station in its later years eBay
The station in its later years eBay
The station in its later years ipernity

Disused railway stations in Derbyshire
Former Midland Railway stations
Railway stations in Great Britain opened in 1890
Railway stations in Great Britain closed in 1930
Bolsover